The Compagnie des Transports en commun de Neuchâtel et environs (TN) was a public transport operator in and around the Swiss city of Neuchâtel. It operated the city's network of trams, trolleybuses and motor buses, under the marketing name Transports Publics du Littoral Neuchâtelois.

See also 
 Trams in Neuchâtel 
 Trolleybuses in Neuchâtel

Transport in Neuchâtel